Khwaja Haider Ali Aatish (1764
–1846) of Lucknow was an Urdu poet. Khwaja Haider Ali Aatish Lakhnawi is one of the giants of Urdu literature. Aatish and Imam Baksh Nasikh were contemporary poets whose rivalry is well known. Both had hundreds of disciples. The era of Aatish-Nasikh was a golden era for Urdu poetry in Lucknow. Aatish is mostly known for his ghazals, and for his amazing and different style of poetry.

Life
His ancestors had moved from Delhi to Lucknow. His focus on subjective experience, examining how people retain dignity in suffering, set him apart from other Luckhnavi ghazal writers like Nasikh, who emphasised the technical aspects of Ghazal writing. He also wrote poems in the Khamariyyat tradition, to protest the ills of the feudal society.

It is also said that Aatish belonged to Faizabad, his father had died early during his childhood, but his deep instinctive taste of poetry gave Aatish easy access to the court of Nawab Mohammed Taqi Khan Taraqqi who took him to Lucknow. In Lucknow he became a disciple of Mushafi, an important poet of the Lucknow school. Soon after the death of Nasikh, Aatish stopped writing poetry. Some critics rank him after Mir and Ghalib.

Pandit Dayashankar Nasim was a student of Aatish.

Works
Kulliyat-e-Khwaja Haider Ali Atish 
Deewan-e-Aatish

See also
 List of Urdu poets

References

Further reading
 Ghazal in Urdu, Hindi and Roman scripts
 Rivalry of Aatish-Nasikh

External links

 Khwaja Haidar Ali Atish at Kavita Kosh (Hindi font)
 Khwaja Haidar Ali Atish Poetry
 Read Khwaja Haidar Ali Atish at Jakhira.com in Hindi font 
 http://www.bestghazals.net/2007/01/ye-aarzoo-thi-tujhe-gul-ke-rubaru-karte.html

1764 births
1846 deaths
Indian poets
18th-century Indian Muslims
19th-century Indian Muslims
18th-century Indian poets
19th-century Indian poets
Urdu-language poets from India
Urdu-language writers from Mughal India